Vladimir Zujović (born April 3, 1980) is a retired Serbian professional basketball player.

References

External links
 
 

Living people
1980 births
Alba Fehérvár players
Basketball players from Belgrade
Basketball League of Serbia players
Lock Haven Bald Eagles men's basketball players
KK Lions/Swisslion Vršac players
KK Napredak Kruševac players
KK Borac Banja Luka players
Mercer Bears men's basketball players
Serbian expatriate basketball people in Bosnia and Herzegovina
Serbian expatriate basketball people in Cyprus
Serbian expatriate basketball people in Greece
Serbian expatriate basketball people in Hungary
Serbian expatriate basketball people in Slovenia
Serbian expatriate basketball people in North Macedonia
Serbian expatriate basketball people in the United States
Serbian men's basketball players
Small forwards
Shooting guards